Lovro Žemva (10 August 1911 – 27 December 1981) was a Slovenian cross-country skier. He competed in the men's 50 kilometre event at the 1936 Winter Olympics.

References

1911 births
1981 deaths
Slovenian male cross-country skiers
Olympic cross-country skiers of Yugoslavia
Cross-country skiers at the 1936 Winter Olympics
People from Upper Carniola